The 1986 Pittsburgh Panthers football team represented the University of Pittsburgh in the sport of American football during the 1986 NCAA Division I-A football season.

Schedule

Coaching staff

Team players drafted into the NFL

References

Pittsburgh
Pittsburgh Panthers football seasons
Pittsburgh Panthers football